Commodore Hotel may refer to:
Grand Hyatt New York, formerly named Commodore Hotel
Commodore Hotel (Portland, Oregon)